The Alfred Buffat Homestead, also known as The Maples, is a historic home with several surviving outbuildings located on Love Creek Road in Knoxville, Tennessee, United States.  Its architectural style is Italianate.

Alfred Buffat was a French-Swiss immigrant. He built the first story of The Maples in 1867 for his bride.  A second story was added three years later.  The house has wood siding, with a modest front porch.  The property originally included a grist mill and other buildings.  In addition to the main house, the miller's cottage, smokehouses, wash house, barns and utility buildings are still standing.

The house is a private residence, and is not open to the public. It was listed on the National Register of Historic Places in 1975.

References

Notes

Sources
 Knoxville: Fifty Landmarks. (Knoxville: The Knoxville Heritage Committee of the Junior League of Knoxville, 1976), page 17.

Houses completed in 1867
Houses in Knoxville, Tennessee
Houses on the National Register of Historic Places in Tennessee
National Register of Historic Places in Knoxville, Tennessee